Bataan Peninsula State University (BPSU) is one of the state universities in the province of Bataan, Philippines. It is a conglomeration of higher education institutions in Bataan.

History
Before the conversion, BPSU had three campuses; two were located in the City of Balanga while the third was situated in Orani, Bataan. The passage of RA 9403 resulted in the expansion of BPSU's campuses as the Act integrated the Bataan State College in Dinalupihan and its satellite campus in Abucay.

The Bataan Peninsula State University was established by Republic Act 9403 which was signed into law on 22 March 2007.

In June 2008, the university made education more accessible to the residents of the towns of Bagac and Morong by establishing an extension in the Municipality of Bagac. The extension offers courses like BS Entrepreneurship, BS Hotel and Restaurant Management, first two years of Nursing, and General Engineering courses.

The university has three programs granted with Level 1 Accreditation from AACCUP. Fifty-six programs are scheduled for accreditation from 2008 to 2012.

Campuses and locations
 Capitol Compound (Main campus)
 Abucay Campus
 Balanga Campus
 Dinalupihan Campus
 Orani Campus
 Bagac Extension Campus
 Morong, Bataan - soon to rise
 Mariveles - no plan yet

Gallery

References

External links
 

Universities and colleges in Bataan
State universities and colleges in the Philippines
Education in Balanga, Bataan